Saidat Onanuga (born 18 June 1974) is a Nigerian former track and field sprinter who specialised in the 400 metres. She also competed in the 400 metres hurdles. She represented Nigeria at the World Championships in Athletics in 1997, competing as a relay alternate.

Onanuga began her career in the 800 metres, winning Nigerian national titles in 1990 and 1991 before moving into the 400 m sprint and hurdles. An appearance at the 1992 World Junior Championships in Athletics came soon afterwards.

She established herself as a senior at the 1996 African Championships in Athletics, where she was the gold medallist in both the 400 m and 400 m hurdles. She claimed her third gold of the tournament in the 4 × 400 metres relay. This proved to be the peak of her career individually, although she did won hurdles bronze medals and relay gold at both the 1998 African Championships in Athletics and the 1999 All-Africa Games.

Onanuga competed in American collegiate competitions for the UTEP Miners. The competitions of the Nigerian University Games Association allowed Onanuga's sporting talent to be identified and led to her recruitment by an American college – a growing phenomenon during that period.

International competitions

National titles
Nigerian Athletics Championships
800 metres: 1990, 1991
400 metres hurdles: 1993, 1999

References

External links

Living people
1974 births
Nigerian female sprinters
Nigerian female hurdlers
World Athletics Championships athletes for Nigeria
UTEP Miners women's track and field athletes
African Games gold medalists for Nigeria
African Games medalists in athletics (track and field)
African Games bronze medalists for Nigeria
Athletes (track and field) at the 1999 All-Africa Games
20th-century Nigerian women